David Rittenhouse Junior High School is a historic junior high school building located at Norristown, Montgomery County, Pennsylvania.  It was built in 1928, and is a "T"-plan building in the Colonial Revival style. It is a three-story, red brick building with limestone trim and detailing.  It features an ornate, two-story, semi-circular entrance portico, palladian window, and limestone clad tower.  The school closed in June 1981. It was named for David Rittenhouse (1732–1796).

It was added to the National Register of Historic Places in 1996.

References

School buildings on the National Register of Historic Places in Pennsylvania
Colonial Revival architecture in Pennsylvania
School buildings completed in 1928
National Register of Historic Places in Montgomery County, Pennsylvania
1928 establishments in Pennsylvania